The Y1-class was a class of four trams built by the Melbourne & Metropolitan Tramways Board built as a modified version of the Y-class to trial one man operation. Initially used on East and West Preston routes from Collins Street, from 1934 they were transferred to the Toorak line. From 1936 they were used on Burwood services from Camberwell depot. In 1933, 613 was used on Victorian Railways' Sandringham railway station to Black Rock line.

In 1965, the class was transferred to Glenhuntly depot to avoid running into the city due to a lack of number boxes. Withdrawn in 1965, they were retained as driver training cars at Hawthorn depot with 613 having just been overhauled at Preston Workshops. In late 1990, 611 was briefly used in regular service out of Kew depot.

Preservation
All four have been preserved:
610 by the Bendigo Tramways
611 by the Sydney Tramway Museum
612 by the Tramway Museum Society of Victoria
613 as part of the VicTrack heritage fleet at Hawthorn depot

References

Melbourne tram vehicles
600 V DC multiple units